Somerset Township is one of sixteen townships in Jackson County, Illinois, USA.  As of the 2010 census, its population was 4,205 and it contained 1,886 housing units.

Geography

Cities, towns, villages
 Murphysboro (north quarter)

Unincorporated towns
 Harrison at 
(This list is based on USGS data and may include former settlements.)

Adjacent townships
 Vergennes Township (north)
 Elk Township (northeast)
 DeSoto Township (east)
 Carbondale Township (southeast)
 Murphysboro Township (south)
 Sand Ridge Township (southwest)
 Levan Township (west)
 Ora Township (northwest)

Cemeteries
The township contains these four cemeteries: Boucher, Lutheran, Ripley and Zion.

Major highways
  Illinois Route 13
  Illinois Route 149

Landmarks
 Lake Murphysboro State Park (east quarter)

Demographics

School districts
 Elverado Community Unit School District 196
 Murphysboro Community Unit School District 186

Political districts
 Illinois' 12th congressional district
 State House District 115
 State Senate District 58

References
 
 United States Census Bureau 2007 TIGER/Line Shapefiles
 United States National Atlas

External links
 City-Data.com
 Illinois State Archives

Townships in Jackson County, Illinois
Townships in Illinois